Phyllophaga vetula is a species of scarab beetle in the family Scarabaeidae. It lives in Central America and North America.

References

Further reading

 

Melolonthinae
Articles created by Qbugbot
Beetles described in 1887